Knopp-Labach is a municipality in Südwestpfalz district, in Rhineland-Palatinate, western Germany. It is situated approximately 15 km northwest of Pirmasens, and 15 km northeast of Zweibrücken. Until 1 July 2014, when it became part of the Verbandsgemeinde ("collective municipality") Thaleischweiler-Wallhalben, Knopp-Labach had been a part of the Verbandsgemeinde Wallhalben.

References

Kashofen
Südwestpfalz